Little Houghton is a  hamlet and civil parish in the Metropolitan Borough of Barnsley, South Yorkshire, England.  At the 2001 census it had a population of 618, increasing to 659 at the 2011 Census.

Access to the hamlet of Little Houghton is gained by travelling along Middlecliff Lane through the village of Middlecliffe.  The larger village is made up of mainly council and ex-council houses.

Little Houghton was previously the site of two large coal mines. Houghton Main was a deep shaft mine and Dearne Valley a drift mine. Both mines are now closed and their sites have been landscaped, which has been partly funded by money from the European Union. Before the coal mines, the village was involved in agriculture and there were a number of farms in the village with associated cottages. Only two of the old farm buildings remain, but some have recently been converted into housing.

The two settlements  come under Little Houghton Parish Council.

Sports
In September 2006, Houghton Main, the local village cricket team won the Village Cup Final, held at Lord's Cricket Ground.

References

External links

Hamlets in South Yorkshire
Geography of the Metropolitan Borough of Barnsley
Civil parishes in South Yorkshire